Sīkrags (Livonian: Sīkrõg) is a populated place in Kolka Parish, Talsi Municipality, Latvia. It is one of the twelve Livonian villages on Līvõd rānda—the Livonian Coast.

Other names: Sīkrags, Sīkraga, Sikraguciems, Sikrag, Sīkraguciems, Sikraga, Sikragutsiyems.

The Siekragciems Lighthouse is situated on the west side of the village.

Notable people 
Pētõr Damberg, Livonian linguist, poet and teacher was born in Sīkrags.

See also
Livonian people

References 

Towns and villages in Latvia
Talsi Municipality
Courland